Black Tie Affair is an American crime drama spoof from Jay Tarses that aired on NBC from May 29 until June 19, 1993. During production, the series was known as Smoldering Lust.

Premise
Set in the 1940s, a private eye, who is also a record store owner, investigates a philandering tycoon in San Francisco.

Cast
Bradley Whitford as Dave Brodsky
Kate Capshaw as Margo Cody
John Calvin as Christopher Cody
Bruce McGill as Hal Kempner
Alison Elliott as Eve Saskatchewan

Episodes

Reception
Julio Martinez of Variety praised the series for having "a top-notch ensemble", but criticized it for not having "enough character substance and plot development to sustain one's interest in what's to follow". Lisa Schwarzbaum of Entertainment Weekly was more negative on the series, criticizing "the show's lack of smolder, lack of lustiness, and lack of ability to carry off the affectionate parody of the pulp-novel genre".

In 1994, a book authored by Vance Muse titled We Bombed in Burbank: A Joyride to Prime Time was published detailing the failure of Black Tie Affair.

References

External links

TV Guide

1993 American television series debuts
1993 American television series endings
1990s American crime drama television series
1990s American satirical television series
English-language television shows
NBC original programming
Television shows set in San Francisco
Television series by Sony Pictures Television